Cham Chit (also Romanized as Cham Chīt; also known as Cham Chid) is a village in Dorud Rural District, in the Central District of Dorud County, Lorestan Province, Iran. At the 2006 census, its population was 39, in 8 families.

References 

Towns and villages in Dorud County